Cellarius may refer to:

Surname 

Cellarius is the Latin form of cellarer, an office within a medieval Benedictine abbey. 

As a surname it is usually a Latinized form of the German name Keller. Notable people with the surname include:

 Andreas Cellarius, 1596–1665, German-Dutch mathematician and cartographer
 Christoph Cellarius, 1638–1707, Christoph Keller, Weimar, classical scholar
 Ludwig Cellarius, died 1526, Ludwig Keller of Basel, first husband of Wibrandis Rosenblatt
 Martin Cellarius, 1499–1564, Martin Borrhaus, anti-Trinitarian reformer

Other 
 12618 Cellarius, a minor planet named after Andreas Cellarius
 Cellarius, a pseudonym used by Samuel Butler in his 1863 letter Darwin among the Machines